Rose Thisse-Derouette (20 July 190216 September 1989) was a Belgian composer, conductor, musicologist, folklorist and teacher. She was born in Liège, Belgium, and won the Prix de Rome for composition.

Thisse-Derouette wrote articles on folkloric dance in the 1960s, including "Our older players in Ardennes - Retrospective of a profession which has disappeared: li mestre", published in Watcher in the Walloon, No. 3, "Le recueil de danses manuscrit d’un ménétrier ardennais", published in Annales de l'institut archéologique du Luxembourg (éd. Fasbender, Arlon), and "Nos vieux joueurs de dans ardennais". She died in Liège in 1989.

Works
Thisse-Derouette composed for vocal performance and opera. Selected works include: 
Danses Populaires de Wallonie with Jenny Falize Thisse-Derouette
Le recueil de danses
Poqwè HAD 'nin v'ni for solo voice and piano

References

1902 births
1989 deaths
20th-century classical composers
Belgian music educators
Women classical composers
Belgian opera composers
Belgian classical composers
Musicians from Liège
Women opera composers
Women music educators
20th-century women composers